Fillipos Moschovitis (born November 26, 1978) is a Greek professional basketball player for Nea Kifissia. He is a 1.90 m (6 ft. 3 in.) tall

Youth career
Moschovitis started his career at the youth clubs of Sporting. He was quickly promoted to the senior team, where he stayed for 2 more years.

Professional career
Moschovitis played in several historical Greek teams during his career, including: Peristeri, Panellinios, and Apollon Patras.

References

External links
FIBA Europe Profile
Eurobasket.com Profile
ProBallers.com Profile

1978 births
Living people
Faros Keratsiniou B.C. players
Greek men's basketball players
Pagrati B.C. players
Peristeri B.C. players
Psychiko B.C. players
Point guards
Basketball players from Athens